The women's 4x100m T53-54 event at the 2008 Summer Paralympics took place at the  Beijing National Stadium on 16 September. There were no heats in this event.
The event was won by the team representing .

Results

Final
Competed 16 September at 20:18.

 
WR = World Record. DQ = Disqualified (passing of the baton outside the take-over zone).

References
Official Beijing 2008 Paralympics Results: Final

Athletics at the 2008 Summer Paralympics
2008 in women's athletics